= DesignMyNight =

- Company type: Private
- Website type: Discovery site; Ticket sales; Booking software; Hospitality voucher software
- Available in: English
- Founded: London, United Kingdom
- Headquarters: London, {{{location_country}}}
- Area served: United Kingdom
- Creators: Andrew Webster; Nicholas Telson
- Key people: Katie Kirwan (Nee Houghton), Head of Brand
- Employees: 100
- Website: www.designmynight.com
- Launched: 2011
- Current status: Active

DesignMyNight is a restaurant, pub, bar, club, events and experiences discovery website that was set up in 2011; it allows the customer to tailor their night out depending on their budget and interests, where they want to go and what type of night they're after. The site has coverage across more than 20 cities in the UK and Australia and was branded as one of the world's best start-ups in 2015 and top UK startup in 2014.

DesignMyNight also acts as a software provider for the nightlife industry with its own ticketing solution, Tonic Ticketing, that can be integrated on the site and the client's site as well as an enquiry management and booking software, Access Collins.

== Founders ==
DesignMyNight was founded by Nick Telson and Andrew Webster whilst visiting New York City. The nightlife knowledge of their hotel concierge inspired them to create the service. They both quit their jobs at L’Oréal and Accenture and worked solely on DesignMyNight, with no income for two years, before the business took off in 2013.

In 2017, DesignMyNight was acquired by The Access Group.

== Products ==
In 2013, DesignMyNight launched an app with similar features to their existing service. In February 2014, they launched Collins, an enquiry management and booking software designed specifically for bars, restaurants with bars, pubs and private hire spaces. bar bookings and inquiry-management software. It allows venues to do real-time bookings from their site while also taking enquiries and managing them effectively within the system's back-end. The venue can also take payments, card authentications, manage emails and their client's database. 2014 also saw the launch of the ticketing software that allows event organisers to take advantage of DesignMyNight's up to 3.9 million monthly userbase while also making their own site or social media channels transactional.
